D.D. Kashyap (1910–1988) was an Indian film director, screenwriter and film producer.

Filmography

References

1910 births
1988 deaths
Hindi-language film directors
20th-century Indian film directors
Film directors from Uttar Pradesh
People from Jabalpur